The 1976 French motorcycle Grand Prix was the first round of the 1976 Grand Prix motorcycle racing season. It took place on 25 April 1976 at the Circuit Bugatti Le Mans.

500cc classification

350 cc classification

Footnotes

250 cc classification

Footnotes

50 cc classification

Footnotes

Sidecar classification

Footnotes

References

French motorcycle Grand Prix
French
Motorcycle Grand Prix